Miguel Ángel Ramírez Medina (born 23 October 1984) is a Spanish football manager, currently in charge of Sporting de Gijón.

Career

Early career
Born in Las Palmas, Canary islands, Ramírez joined UD Las Palmas' youth categories in 2003, from AD Claret. In 2011 he moved to Greece, initially to work at AEK FC's youth setup, but subsequently worked at Panathinaikos FC and Olympiacos due to the economic crisis.

In 2012, after a year back at Las Palmas, Ramírez spent a few months working as a scout for Deportivo Alavés before moving to Qatar, joining the Aspire Academy. In 2018, after being also in charge of Qatar's under-14 football team and being assistant of compatriot Félix Sánchez Bas in the under-19s, he moved to Ecuador and was appointed manager of CSD Independiente del Valle's under-18 squad.

Independiente del Valle
On 7 May 2019, after compatriot Ismael Rescalvo was appointed in charge of CS Emelec, Ramírez was appointed manager of the first team. He led the club to the title of the 2019 Copa Sudamericana, the first of his career and the first international accolade of the club's history.

On 19 December 2020, Ramírez confirmed his departure from Del Valle after nearly two years as a manager.

Internacional
On 2 March 2021, Ramírez was announced as manager of Brazilian Série A side Internacional on a two-year contract. On 11 June, being knocked out of the Copa do Brasil by Série B side Vitória, he was sacked.

Charlotte FC
On 7 July 2021, Ramírez was announced as the new head coach of American club Charlotte FC for the club's first season in Major League Soccer. After 14 league matches in charge, Ramirez was sacked on 31 May 2022. This came even though Charlotte FC was tied for eighth place in the Eastern Conference at the time, just short of playoff position.

According to team captain Christian Fuchs, there were a number of "fractures" between the players and Ramírez. Fuchs told WBTV that when he tried to address problems with Ramírez, all too often "the door was shut and that didn't feel good." Fuchs added that Ramírez almost never did post-match analyses with the players, despite their youth.

Sporting Gijón
On 17 January 2023, Ramírez returned to his home country and was appointed in charge of Sporting de Gijón in Segunda División.

Managerial statistics

Honours
Independiente del Valle
Copa Sudamericana: 2019

References

External links

1984 births
Living people
Sportspeople from Las Palmas
Spanish football managers
Sporting de Gijón managers
Campeonato Brasileiro Série A managers
C.S.D. Independiente del Valle managers
Sport Club Internacional managers
Spanish expatriate football managers
Spanish expatriate sportspeople in Greece
Spanish expatriate sportspeople in Qatar
Spanish expatriate sportspeople in Ecuador
Spanish expatriate sportspeople in Brazil
Spanish expatriate sportspeople in the United States
Expatriate football managers in Greece
Expatriate football managers in Qatar
Expatriate football managers in Ecuador
Expatriate football managers in Brazil
Expatriate soccer managers in the United States
Charlotte FC non-playing staff
Major League Soccer coaches